Stefano Rulli (born 3 October 1949) is an Italian screenwriter. He is best known for his collaborations with fellow screenwriter Sandro Petraglia, including La piovra (1987–1995) and The Best of Youth (2003). Rulli also directed the documentary film Un silenzio particolare (2004), about his son Matteo, who has [[schizophrenia<]].

Filmography

Film

Television

Awards and nominations

References

External links

1949 births
Living people
People from Rome
Italian male screenwriters
David di Donatello winners
Nastro d'Argento winners
Ciak d'oro winners